Henry Simard (17 February 1836 – 6 November 1895) was a Canadian merchant and political figure in Quebec, Canada. Simard served in the House of Commons of Canada from 1891 to 1895. During that time, he represented the electoral district of Charlevoix  as a member of the Liberal Party of Canada.

Henry Simard was born on 17 February 1836 in Murray Bay, Lower Canada to Thomas Simard. He was educated at the Collège de Sainte-Anne-de-la-Pocatière in La Pocatière, Quebec. In 1851, Simard married Justine Gagnon, the daughter of fellow Liberal political figure Adolphe Gagnon (b. 1810 - d. 1885).
Simard served as an assistant inspector for Weights and Measures for Charlevoix for 15 years before he began his political career. He was elected to office on 5 March 1891 and died in office on 6 November 1895. He was 59 years old at the time of his death and he had served approximately 1,708 days (4 years, 8 months, and 4 days) in office.

References 
 
 The Canadian parliamentary companion, 1891, AJ Gemmill
 Journals of the House of Commons of the Dominion of Canada, Volume 10

1836 births
1895 deaths
Members of the House of Commons of Canada from Quebec
Liberal Party of Canada MPs
Mayors of places in Quebec